The 5th Infantry Division (Mechanized)—nicknamed the "Red Diamond", or the "Red Devils" —was an infantry division of the United States Army that served in World War I, World War II and the Vietnam War, and with NATO and the U.S. Army III Corps. It was inactivated on 24 November 1992 and reflagged as the 2nd Armored Division.

World War I

Organization
Units associated with the division included:

The Fifth Division (Regular) was organized in December 1917, with headquarters at Camp Logan, Houston, Texas, as a part of the program for the expansion of the armed forces for service in World War 1. No specific date was designated for the division's activation but the initial personnel assigned to the division had a reporting date of December 1.  
 
 Headquarters, 5th Division
 9th Infantry Brigade
 60th Infantry Regiment
 61st Infantry Regiment
 14th Machine Gun Battalion
10th Infantry Brigade
 6th Infantry Regiment
 11th Infantry Regiment
 15th Machine Gun Battalion
 5th Field Artillery Brigade
 19th Field Artillery Regiment (75 mm)
 20th Field Artillery Regiment (75 mm)
 21st Field Artillery Regiment (155 mm)
 5th Trench Mortar Battery
 13th Machine Gun Battalion
 7th Engineer Regiment
 9th Field Signal Battalion
 Headquarters Troop, 5th Division
 5th Train Headquarters and Military Police
 5th Ammunition Train
 5th Supply Train
 5th Engineer Train
 5th Sanitary Train
 17th, 25th, 29th, and 30rd Ambulance Companies and Field Hospitals

The 5th Division was activated on 11 December 1917, just over eight months after the American entry into World War I, at Camp Logan, near Houston, Texas and began training for deployment to the Western Front. The first general officer (Major General Charles Henry Muir) assumed command- - as the activation date of the division. The organization was a "square" division (i.e., there were four infantry regiments) with an authorized strength of 28, 105 personnel

The entire division had arrived in France by 1 May 1918 and components of the units were deployed into the front line. The 5th Division was the eighth of forty-two American divisions to arrive on the Western Front. The 5th Division trained with French Army units from 1 to 14 June 1918. The first soldiers of the unit to be killed in action died on 14 June of that year. Among the division's first casualties was Captain Mark W. Clark, then commanding the 3rd Battalion, 11th Infantry Regiment, who would later become a four-star general. On 12 September, the unit was part of a major attack that reduced the salient at St. Mihiel. The division later fought in the Meuse-Argonne Offensive, the largest battle fought by the American Expeditionary Force (AEF) (and the largest in the history of the U.S. Army) in World War I. The war ended soon after, on November 11, 1918. The division served in the Army of Occupation, being based in Belgium and Esch-sur-Alzette, Luxembourg until it departed Europe.  The division returned to the United States through the New York Port of Embarkation at Hoboken, New Jersey, on 21 July 1919.

Insignia
The 5th Division adopted a red diamond as its shoulder sleeve insignia. The color red was selected in honor of World War I commander John E. McMahon, who was a member of the Army's Field Artillery branch.  The diamond shape was chosen in recognition of the Diamond Dyes company, a maker of fabric coloring products whose ad slogan "It Never Runs" conveyed a martial meaning during war.  The shape of the diamond in the 5th Division's insignia represents strength, because in bridge construction the trusses that provide the greatest durability are mutually supporting isosceles triangles.

Interwar period
The 5th Division was stationed at Camp Gordon, Georgia until October 1920. After that date, it was stationed at Camp Jackson, South Carolina. On 4 October 1921 the 5th Division was inactivated due to funding cuts, but was represented in the Regular Army by its even-numbered infantry brigade (the 10th) and select supporting elements. The division headquarters was placed on the Regular Army Inactive list and staffed by Organized Reserve personnel. On 1 September 1927, the division headquarters was removed from the inactive list and ordered to cease operations; in August 1936, it was provisionally activated at Fort Knox, Kentucky, to control the 10th Infantry Brigade and the West Virginia Army National Guard's 201st Infantry Regiment for the Second Army's Maneuvers.

World War II
On 16 October 1939, the 5th Division was reactivated as part of the United States mobilization in response to the outbreak of World War II in Europe the previous month, being formed at Fort McClellan, Alabama, under the command of Brigadier General Campbell Hodges.

The following spring, in 1940, the division was sent to Fort Benning, Georgia and then temporarily to Louisiana for training exercises, before being transferred to Fort Benjamin Harrison at the end of May 1940. That December the division relocated to Fort Custer, Michigan, from where it participated in the Tennessee maneuvers. The division went next to Camp Joseph T. Robinson, Arkansas, in August 1941 for staging into both the Arkansas and Louisiana maneuvers before returning to Fort Custer that October. The division, under the command of Major General Cortlandt Parker from August, was stationed there when the Japanese attacked Pearl Harbor and Germany declared war on the United States in December 1941, thus bringing the United States into the conflict. As the winter passed the division was brought up to strength and fully equipped for forward deployment into a war zone. During April 1942, the 5th Division received its overseas orders and departed the New York Port of Embarkation (NYPOE) at the end of the month for Iceland. The 5th Division debarked there in May 1942, where it replaced the British garrison on the island outpost along the Atlantic convoy routes and a year later was reorganized and re-designated as the 5th Infantry Division on 24 May 1943.

Normandy

The 5th Infantry Division, now commanded by Major General Stafford LeRoy Irwin, left Iceland in early August 1943 and was sent to England to prepare and train for the eventual invasion of Northwest Europe, then scheduled for the spring of 1944. Upon arrival in England the 5th Division was stationed at Tidworth Barracks, Wiltshire in South West England, before moving to Northern Ireland.

After two years of training the 5th ID landed in Normandy on Utah Beach, on 9 July 1944, over a month after the initial D-Day landings, and four days later took up defensive positions in the vicinity of Caumont-l'Éventé. Launching a successful attack at Vidouville 26 July, the division drove on southeast of Saint-Lô, attacked and captured Angers, 9–10 August, captured Chartres, (assisted by the 7th Armored Division), 18 August, pushed to Fontainebleau, crossed the Seine at Montereau, 24 August, crossed the Marne and seized Reims, 30 August, and positions east of Verdun. The division then prepared for the assault on Metz, 7 September. In mid-September a bridgehead was secured across the Moselle, south of Metz, at Dornot and Arnaville after two attempts. The first attempt at Dornot by the 11th Infantry Regiment failed. German-held Fort Driant played a role in repulsing this crossing. A second crossing by the 10th Infantry Regiment at Arnaville was successful. The division continued operations against Metz, 16 September to 16 October 1944, withdrew, then returned to the assault on 9 November. Metz finally fell 22 November. The division crossed the German border, 4 December, captured Lauterbach (a suburb of Völklingen) on the 5th, and elements reached the west bank of the river Saar, 6 December, before the division moved to assembly areas.

On 16 December, the Germans launched their winter offensive in the Ardennes forest, the Battle of the Bulge, and on the 18th the 5th ID was thrown in against the southern flank of the Bulge, helping to reduce it by the end of January 1945. In February and March, the division drove across and northeast of the Sauer, where it smashed through the Siegfried Line and later took part in the Allied invasion of Germany.

Across the Rhine
The 5th ID crossed the river Rhine at Nierstein on the night of 22 March 1945. After capturing some 19,000 German soldiers, the division continued to Frankfurt-am-Main, clearing and policing the town and its environs, 27–29 March. In April the 5th ID, now commanded by Major General Albert E. Brown, after Major General Irwin's promotion to command of XII Corps, took part in clearing the Ruhr Pocket and then drove across the Czechoslovak border, 1 May, reaching Volary and Vimperk as the war in Europe ended.

Casualties
 Total battle casualties: 12,818
 Killed in action: 2,298
 Wounded in action: 9,549
 Missing in action: 288
 Prisoner of war: 683

Order of battle
Under the new "triangular" organization, units assigned included:

 Headquarters, 5th Infantry Division
 2nd Infantry Regiment
 10th Infantry Regiment
 11th Infantry Regiment
 Headquarters and Headquarters Battery, 5th Infantry Division Artillery
 19th Field Artillery Battalion, (105 mm)
 46th Field Artillery Battalion (105 mm)
 50th Field Artillery Battalion, (105 mm)
 21st Field Artillery Battalion, (155 mm)
 7th Engineer Combat Battalion
 5th Medical Battalion 
 5th Cavalry Reconnaissance Troop (Mechanized)
 Headquarters, Special Troops, 5th Infantry Division
 Headquarters Company, 5th Infantry Division
 705th Ordnance Light Maintenance Company 
 5th Quartermaster Company 
 5th Signal Company 
 Military Police Platoon
 Band
 5th Counterintelligence Corps Detachment

Post-World War II
Following World War II, the 5th Infantry Division was inactivated on 20 September 1946 at Camp Campbell (now Fort) Kentucky. However, the division was reactivated on 15 July 1947 under Brigadier General John H. Church. From 1951 to 1953, the division was at Fort Indiantown Gap, PA training 30,000 replacements for the Korean War. The 1950s saw the division in West Germany as part of the US contribution to NATO though the division later returned to the United States.

Vietnam War

When the 1st Infantry Division deployed to South Vietnam in 1965, additional maneuver battalions were required; thus two infantry battalions from the 2nd Brigade, 5th Infantry Division, at Fort Devens, Massachusetts, were relieved and assigned to "The Big Red One." In September 1965, the 2nd Brigade, 5th Infantry Division was moved, minus personnel, to Fort Carson, Colorado, and refilled there. The remaining personnel at Fort Devens formed the basis of the 196th Infantry Brigade.

By 1968 the division was stationed at Fort Carson, Colorado, as a mechanized formation. 1st Brigade, 5th Infantry Division was dispatched to South Vietnam after the Tet Offensive to replace a U.S. Marine Corps unit. The brigade, consisting of one battalion each of infantry, mechanized infantry and armor, served there from July 1968 until 1971 defending the Vietnamese Demilitarized Zone in northern Quảng Trị Province. Combat units included 1st Battalion, 11th Infantry; 1st Battalion, 61st Infantry (Mechanized); 1st Battalion, 77th Armor; A Troop, 4th Squadron, 12th Cavalry; and 5th Battalion, 4th Artillery, A Co. 7th Engineer BN.(Society of the Fifth Division) On 22 August 1971, the colors of 1st Brigade, 5th Infantry Division were cased and the brigade was inactivated at Fort Carson. Its final assignment was to III Corps, with the mission of reinforcing Europe if a general war was to break out there. In September 1969 the 4th Brigade, 5th Infantry Division was activated at Fort Carson, although, on the later return of 4th Infantry Division home from Vietnam in December 1970, the 4th Division replaced the 5th Division at Fort Carson, whereupon the 5th Division was inactivated.

Post-Vietnam
On 21 October 1974 the 1st Brigade, 5th Infantry Division was reactivated at Fort Polk, LA., as part of the Army's new 24-division force. Due to lack of sufficient housing, the brigade initially only had two maneuver battalions. (Maneuver and Firepower, Chap XIII) The division base and a second brigade was organized in 1975–77, and the Louisiana Army National Guard's 256th Infantry Brigade was assigned as the 'round-out' third brigade of the division.

In 1989, units of the 5th Division, based at Fort Polk, Louisiana, deployed in support of Operation Nimrod Dancer to protect American interests in Panama. First Battalion, 61st Infantry (Mechanized), "Roadrunners" (1st Brigade, 5th ID) was one of the first reinforcing units and remained there until September when there was a hand over to 4th Battalion, Sixth Infantry (Mechanized), "Regulars" (2nd Brigade, 5th ID). 4–6 Infantry was in country and assisted during Operation Just Cause helping to overthrow Panamanian leader Manuel Noriega, and also assisted in an emergency extraction of Delta Force operators engaged in Operation Acid Gambit when their helicopter went down. Two Soldiers were killed in action from the 5th Infantry Division during Just Cause: CPL Ivan M. Perez and PVT Kenneth D. Scott.

In August 1990, the 5th Division was alerted to prepare for deployment in support of Operation Desert Shield, and the Louisiana Army National Guard's 256th Infantry Brigade was mobilized as the 'round-out' third brigade in November. The Division began sending units to train at Fort Hood, and established a division headquarters-forward (5ID-(Fwd)) at the Texas base to prepare for deployment. The plan was to get all elements of the 256th Brigade up to standards, and then complete a rotation at the National Training Center at Fort Irwin, CA, before the division deployed to Southwest Asia. The 5ID (fwd) immediately encountered problems with the 256th Brigade units, and training began to suffer as a result. Several members of the 256th Brigade went AWOL (Absent without leave), while others refused to train as directed. These delays prevented the Division from deploying to Fort Irwin, and the subsequent rapid start and end of Operation Desert Storm effectively kept the Division from ultimately deploying to Southwest Asia in any capacity. All units returned to Fort Polk by March 1991, with the 256th Brigade demobilization occurring later in May of that same year.

The 5th Division remained at Fort Polk until it was inactivated and reflagged as the 2nd Armored Division November 1992.

Commanders
(Partial list)

Inactivation
The division was inactivated for the final time on 24 November 1992, and reflagged as the U.S. 2nd Armored Division as part of the post-Cold War drawdown of US forces.  The 2nd Armored Division moved from Fort Polk to Fort Hood, Texas, in 1993, with the majority of the 5th Division's equipment.

Though it was inactivated, the division was identified as the third highest priority inactive division in the United States Army Center of Military History's lineage scheme due to its numerous accolades and long history. All of the division's flags and heraldic items were moved to the National Infantry Museum at Fort Benning, Georgia, following its inactivation. Should the U.S. Army decide to activate more divisions in the future, the center will most likely suggest the first new division be the 9th Infantry Division, the second be the 24th Infantry Division, the third be the 5th Infantry Division, and the fourth be the 2nd Armored Division.

In popular culture
In the Axis & Allies miniatures role-playing game, a US infantry unit was designated "Red Devil Captain."

In the Twilight: 2000 role-playing game, players start out as members of the 5th ID in July 2000, after the division is overrun by Soviet and Polish units near Kalisz, Poland during a hypothetical World War III.

In the 1981 movie Taps, the Red Diamond patch of the 5ID is worn by a Master Sergeant who is the father of one of the cadets at the school.

In the Bethesda Studios game Fallout 4, in the beginning section it is mentioned that the 5ID is stationed in Southeast Asia.

Notes

Further reading
 Society of the Fifth Division, United States Army, veterans of the World War, and Kenyon Stevenson. The Official History of the Fifth Division, U.S.A., During the Period of Its Organization and of Its Operations in the European World War, 1917–1919. The Red Diamond (Meuse) Division.

External links

 Society of the 5th Infantry Division
 5th Infantry Division Directory
 
 Organization of the 5th Mechanized Infantry Division At Fort Polk, LA
 5th Infantry Division Order of Battle in the ETO
 5th Infantry Division in Luxembourg 1918-1919

005th Infantry Division, U.S.
05
Infantry Division, U.S. 005th
Infantry divisions of the United States Army in World War II
Military history of Iceland during World War II
005th Infantry Division
Military units and formations established in 1917
Military units and formations disestablished in 1992